Thomas "Cotton" Priddy (August 29, 1928 – June 10, 1956) was a NASCAR Grand National race car driver from Louisville, Kentucky, USA.
He was the driver who died at the Memphis-Arkansas Speedway during a race on June 10, 1956. He was traveling an estimated 90 mph, thrown clear, and suffered multiple fractures. He died an hour after the accident occurred in a West Memphis, Arkansas, hospital. This was his first time competing in a NASCAR grand-national race.

Career
Priddy was posthumously awarded $50 in winnings ($ when considering inflation) from his final race. Previously, he raced twice in the 1953 season. With zero finishes in the top ten, Priddy had only seventy-three laps of experience. Earning only a grand total of $125 at the time of his death ($ when considering inflation), his earnings were paltry even back in those days.

Priddy's best finishes were on road courses with an average finish of 20th place; his average finish on dirt tracks was 28th place.

References

External links
 

1928 births
1956 deaths
NASCAR drivers
Racing drivers from Louisville, Kentucky
Racing drivers who died while racing
Sports deaths in Arkansas